Nandewar (code NAN), an interim Australian bioregion, is located in New South Wales and Queensland, and comprises an area of , surrounded by the Brigalow Belt South to the west, south-west and north-west, and to the east by the New England Tablelands. This is a region of hills on Palaeozoic sediments and lithosols   and of Eucalyptus albens woodlands and summer rainfall.

Regions
In the IBRA system Nandewar has the code of (NAN), and it has four sub-regions:

See also

 Geography of Australia

References

Biogeography of New South Wales
Biogeography of Queensland
Eastern Australian temperate forests
IBRA regions